Lithophane baileyi, or Bailey's pinion, is a species of cutworm or dart moth in the family Noctuidae. It is found in North America.

The MONA or Hodges number for Lithophane baileyi is 9902.

References

Further reading

External links

 

baileyi
Articles created by Qbugbot
Moths described in 1877